Old Quarrington is a hamlet in County Durham, in England. It is situated between Bowburn and Quarrington Hill. It is also known locally as Heugh Hall, which was the name of a local colliery.

In the Middle Ages, Old Quarrington was the centre of a district of County Durham called “Queringdonshire" (Quarringtonshire), which contained nearby Sherburn, Shadforth, Cassop, Tursdale and Whitwell House.

References

External links

Villages in County Durham